Robert Hook may refer to:

 Robert Hooke (1635–1703), English natural philosopher, architect and polymath
 Robert William Hook (1828–1911), coxswain of the Lowestoft lifeboat (1853–1883), credited with saving more than 600 lives

See also
Robert Hooks (born 1937), American actor, producer, and activist